Marq de Villiers,  is a South African-Canadian writer and journalist. He now chiefly writes non-fiction books on scientific topics. In the past he also worked as a magazine editor and foreign correspondent.

Biography
Marq de Villiers was born in 1940 in Bloemfontein, South Africa. In 1989 he became the first recipient of the prestigious Alan Paton Award for White Tribe Dreaming. He and his wife, the writer Sheila Hirtle, live in Port Medway, Nova Scotia. They often collaborate on books.

In 2010, he was made a Member of the Order of Canada. In 2011 his book, Our Way Out was published, dealing with the problems surrounding climate change, and possible solutions.

Bibliography

References

External links
WorldCat Identities page
Author's website

1940 births
Living people
Canadian science writers
Canadian journalists
Members of the Order of Canada
People from Bloemfontein
South African emigrants to Canada
Governor General's Award-winning non-fiction writers